Roscoe (also spelled Rosco, Roscow, and Ruscoe) is a Cornish name originating from the Old Norse words for "doe wood" or "roebuck copse". It is also an Americanized spelling of the French name Racicot, and possibly a corruption of Roscrowe.

People with the given name
 Roscoe "Fatty" Arbuckle (1877–1933), silent film star
 Roscoe Bartlett (born 1926), U.S. Representative from the state of Maryland
 Roscoe Beck, American bass guitarist and record producer
 Roscoe Born (born 1950), American actor
 Roscoe Brady (1923–2016), American biochemist
 Roscoe Brown (1922–2016), US Army Air Force pilot
 Roscoe Lee Browne (1925–2007), American actor and director
 Roscoe Bulmer (1874–1919), US Navy captain
 Roscoe Conkling (1829–1888), American politician
 Roscoe G. Dickinson (1894–1945), American chemist
 Roscoe Dixon (1949–2021), American politician
 Roscoe D'Sane (born 1980), English footballer
 Roscoe Goose (1891–1971), American jockey
 Rosco Gordon (1928–2002), American blues singer and songwriter
 Roscoe H. Hillenkoetter (1897–1982), US Navy vice admiral and first director of the Central Intelligence Agency
 Roscoe Holcomb (1912–1981), American singer and musician
 Roscoe Karns (1891–1970), American actor
 Roscoe R. Koch (1887–1963), American politician 
 Roscoe C. McCulloch (1880–1958), American politician
 Rosco McGlashan (born 1950), Australian drag racing driver
 Roscoe Miller (1876–1913), American Major League Baseball pitcher
 Roscoe Mitchell (born 1940), African-American composer, jazz instrumentalist and educator,
 Roscoe Nicholson (1887–1959), American surveyor and conservationist
 Roscoe Orman (born 1944), American actor and comedian best known for playing Gordon on Sesame Street
 Roscoe Parrish (born 1982), American National Football League wide receiver
 Roscoe C. Patterson (1876–1954), American Senator and US Representative from Missouri 
 Roscoe Pondexter (born 1952), American basketball player
 Roscoe Pound (1870–1964), American legal scholar and educator
 Roscoe Reynolds (born 1942), US Senator from Virginia
 Roscoe Robinson, Jr. (1928–1993), first African American four-star general in the US Army
 Roscoe Sarles (1892–1922), American race car driver
 Roscow Shedden, Anglican Bishop of Nassau (1919–1931)
 Roscoe Shelton (1931–2002), American electric blues and R&B singer
 Roscoe Tanner (born 1951), American retired tennis player
 Roscoe Thompson (1922–1988), American NASCAR driver 
 Roscoe Troxler (1883–1976), American jockey
 Roscoe Turner (1895–1970), American aviator
 Roscoe B. Woodruff (1891–1975), American major general

People with the surname
 Alan Roscoe (1886–1933), American film actor 
 Andy Roscoe, English footballer
 Bill Roscoe (born 1956), British professor of computing
 Francis James Roscoe (1831–1878), Canadian entrepreneur and politician
 Henry Enfield Roscoe (1833–1915), English chemist and university vice-chancellor
 Ingrid Roscoe (born 1944), art historian and Lord Lieutenant of West Yorkshire
 James Roscoe (1820-1890), English locomotive engineer and colliery owner
 Kenneth H. Roscoe (1914–1970), British civil engineer
 Margaret Roscoe (c. 1786 – 1840), English botanical illustrator and author
 Martin Roscoe (born 1952), English classical pianist
 Patrick Roscoe (born 1962), Canadian writer
 Samantha Roscoe (born 1995), Australian-British basketball player
 Theodore Roscoe (1906–1992), American writer
 Will Roscoe (born 1964), American activist and author
 William Roscoe (1753–1831), English historian
 Alan Ruscoe (born 1972), British actor
 John Ruscoe (1623–1702), founding settler of Norwalk, Connecticut
 Melissa Ruscoe (born 1976), New Zealand association football and rugby player
 Scott Ruscoe (born 1977), Welsh footballer and manager
 Sybil Ruscoe (born 1960), English radio and television presenter

People with the nickname or stage name
 Roscoe Dash, stage name of American rapper Jeffery Johnson Jr. (born 1990)
 Ross Taylor ("Roscoe" Taylor) (born 1984), New Zealand cricketer
 Herman "Roscoe" Ernest III (1951–2011), American drummer
 Roscoe (rapper) (born 1983), brother of Kurupt
 Bronco Mendenhall (born 1966), Brigham Young University football coach
 Ian Ross (newsreader) (1940–2014), Australian news presenter
 Sterling Roswell, drummer in the British band Spacemen 3
 Terry Ruskowski (born 1954), Canadian former National Hockey League player nicknamed "Roscow"

Fictional characters
 Sheriff Rosco P. Coltrane, from The Dukes of Hazzard
 Michael J. Roscoe and his son Paul Roscoe, from the second book in Anthony Horowitz's Alex Rider series, Point Blanc
 Roscoe, mascot of the Milwaukee Admirals minor league hockey team
 Roscoe, character from the channel 4 programme Shameless
 Roscoe, character from Oliver & Company
 Roscoe family, characters in the British soap opera Hollyoaks
 Roscoe Sweeney, character from Marvel's Daredevil
Roscoe, from The Killing Floor by Lee Child

See also

 Roscoe (disambiguation)

References

Cornish-language surnames
English masculine given names